Giorgio Santarelli (born 5 June 1981) is an Italian former footballer who played as a defender.

Club career

Giorgio Santarelli signed his first professional footballing contract with Rome team Lazio, he then had a loan spell with former Italian Serie C2 club Catania, he then transferred to Serie C1 team Avellino. Giorgio moved to Rosetana followed by Latina, he then moved to Cisco Roma.

External links
 Career profile by tuttocalciatori.net

1981 births
Italian footballers
Living people
Sportspeople from the Province of Frosinone
Serie B players
Catania S.S.D. players
U.S. Avellino 1912 players
Ascoli Calcio 1898 F.C. players

Association football defenders
Footballers from Lazio